Tamsica geralea is a moth of the family Crambidae. It is endemic to the Hawaiian island of Kauai.

External links

Diptychophorini
Endemic moths of Hawaii